Beijing Sinobo Guoan F.C. is a professional Chinese football club that currently participates in the Chinese Super League under licence from the Chinese Football Association (CFA). The team is based in the Chaoyang District in Beijing and their home stadium is the Workers' Stadium with a seating capacity of 66,161. Their shareholders are the real estate company Sinobo Group (64%) and CITIC Limited (36%) of CITIC Group, a state-owned enterprise of China. Beijing Guoan F.C. was founded as a professional team by CITIC Guoan Group, which was a subsidiary of CITIC Group until 2014.

This is a list of historical Beijing Guoan F.C. chairmen & general managers.

List of chairmen 

Below is the official history of Beijing Guoan F.C. chairmen until the present day.

List of general managers 

Below is the official history of Beijing Guoan F.C. general managers until the present day.

Notes 
 Club's de facto top decision maker as vice chairman (2002-2009) and honorary chairman (2009-2016).
 Served as interim general manager.

References 

Beijing Guoan F.C.
Beijing Guoan F.C. chairmen and general managers